Vanesca Nortan (born 17 November 1981 in Zaandam, Netherlands) is a Dutch karateka who won gold medals in the female kumite open class at the 2005 European Karate Championships and in the +68 kg weight class at the 2010 European Karate Championships. Nortan also won a silver medal in the female kumite +60 kg weight class and won a bronze medal in the female kumite open class at the 2004 World Karate Championships.

References

External links
http://www.surinamstars.com/Vanesca.html

1981 births
Living people
Dutch female karateka
Dutch sportspeople of Surinamese descent
Sportspeople from Zaanstad
Competitors at the 2005 World Games
20th-century Dutch women
21st-century Dutch women